Sam Collins (born 15 June 1994) is a professional Australian rules footballer who plays for the  in the Australian Football League (AFL).

Early life
Originally from Donvale, Collins is the youngest of four children and attended Whitefriars College, graduating in 2012. As a junior, Collins played for the Donvale Football Club. He played for the Oakleigh Chargers in the TAC Cup Under 18s competition before moving onto the Box Hill Hawks Football Club in the Victorian Football League (VFL). Collins was a member of the Box Hill Hawks leadership team from age 19. He was recruited as a mature age player to Fremantle with their third selection, 55th overall, in the 2015 AFL draft. He has made his AFL debut in Round 10 of the 2016 AFL season, against St Kilda at Etihad Stadium, after playing well for Fremantle's reserves team, Peel Thunder, in the West Australian Football League (WAFL).

AFL career
Collins was delisted by Fremantle at the conclusion of the 2017 season, in the same year in which he won the Dudley Tuckey Medal for Peel Thunder's Best and Fairest player  and was named in the WAFL team of the year. He was not drafted by another AFL club in the 2017 AFL draft, and returned to Melbourne to play for Werribee Football Club. He won the Werribee Football Club Best and Fairest in 2018, was named in the VFL team of the year and came equal third in the JJ Liston Medal for the competitions best player.

The  signed Collins as a mature aged state-league concession prior to the 2018 AFL draft, and will play for the club from 2019 onwards.

In 2020, Collins was named in the Suns leadership group and went on to win the Club Champion Award.

Statistics
 Statistics are correct to the end of round 3, 2022

|-
|- style="background-color: #EAEAEA"
! scope="row" style="text-align:center" | 2016
|style="text-align:center;"|
| 40 || 12 || 0 || 0 || 89 || 68 || 157 || 62 || 31 || 0.0 || 0.0 || 7.4 || 5.7 || 13.1 || 5.2 || 2.6 || 0
|-
! scope="row" style="text-align:center" | 2017
|style="text-align:center;"|
| 40 || 2 || 0 || 0 || 7 || 14 || 21 || 6 || 8 || 0.0 || 0.0 || 3.5 || 7.0 || 10.5 || 3.0 || 4.0 || 0
|- style="background-color: #EAEAEA"
! scope="row" style="text-align:center" | 2019
|style="text-align:center;"|
| 25 || 9 || 0 || 0 || 65 || 44 || 109 || 43 || 12 || 0.0 || 0.0 || 7.2 || 4.9 || 12.1 || 4.8 || 1.3 || 0
|-
! scope="row" style="text-align:center" | 2020
|style="text-align:center;"|
| 25 || 17 || 0 || 0 || 107 || 68 || 175 || 74 || 27 || 0.0 || 0.0 || 6.3 || 4.0 || 10.3 || 4.4 || 1.6 || 0
|- style="background-color: #EAEAEA"
! scope="row" style="text-align:center" | 2021
|style="text-align:center;"|
| 25 || 19 || 0 || 0 || 152 || 78 || 230 || 119 || 32 || 0.0 || 0.0 || 8.0 || 4.1 || 12.1 || 6.3 || 1.7 || 2
|-
! scope="row" style="text-align:center" | 2022
|style="text-align:center;"|
| 25 || 3 || 0 || 0 || 22 || 10 || 32 || 15 || 3 || 0.0 || 0.0 || 7.3 || 3.3 || 10.7 || 5.0 || 1.0 || TBA
|-
|- class="sortbottom"
! colspan=3| Career
! 62
! 0
! 0
! 442
! 282
! 724
! 319
! 113
! 0.0
! 0.0
! 7.1
! 4.5
! 11.7
! 5.1
! 1.8
! 2
|}

Notes

Family life
Sam's father, Kevin Collins, has an extensive background in playing and coaching football. He played for many years at Oakleigh in the VFA and then coached at a number of clubs. He led Donvale FC to numerous premierships and had coaching stints at Box Hill FC coaching Sam to a Premiership. Kevin Collins continues to be involved in coaching and returned to Donvale FC to become the senior coach in 2020.

References

External links

1994 births
Living people
Fremantle Football Club players
Peel Thunder Football Club players
Box Hill Football Club players
Oakleigh Chargers players
Australian rules footballers from Melbourne
Werribee Football Club players
Gold Coast Football Club players
Gold Coast Suns Club Champion winners
People from Donvale, Victoria